Kharkhari Jatmal is a village located in the Najafgarh sub-division, South West Delhi district of Delhi. As of the 2011 Census of India, it has a population of  spread over  households.

Government and politics
At the state level, the village comes under the Matiala constituency of the Delhi Legislative Assembly. As of the 2020 Delhi Legislative Assembly election, its representative in the assembly is Gulab Singh of the Aam Aadmi Party.

See also
 Najafgarh

References

Villages in South West Delhi district